Saint Pierre and Miquelon, officially the Territorial Collectivity of Saint-Pierre and Miquelon, is a self-governing territorial overseas collectivity of France in the northwestern Atlantic Ocean near the Canadian province of Newfoundland and Labrador. An archipelago of eight islands, Saint Pierre and Miquelon is a remaining vestige of the once-vast territory of New France. Its residents are French citizens; the collectivity elects its own deputy to the National Assembly and participates in senatorial and presidential elections.

The islands are in the Gulf of St. Lawrence near the entrance of Fortune Bay, which extends into the southwestern coast of Newfoundland, near the Grand Banks of Newfoundland.

Etymology 
 is French for Saint Peter, the patron saint of fishermen.

"Gisant la Colombe de S. Pierre le pertuis de Micquellon nord noroest & sud suest: y a 7 l. It has been claimed that the name Miquelon is a Basque form of Michael; Mikel and Mikels are usually named Mikelon in the Basque Country. Therefore, from Mikelon it may have been written in the French way with a q instead of a k.

The Basque Country is divided between Spain and France, and most Basques live south of the border, so Miquelon may have been influenced by the Spanish name , an augmentative form of Miguel meaning "big Michael".

History

Archaeological evidence indicates that indigenous peoples, such as the Beothuk, visited St Pierre and Miquelon, but it is not thought that they settled on the islands permanently. On 21 October 1520 the Portuguese explorer João Álvares Fagundes landed on the islands and named the St. Pierre island group the 'Eleven Thousand Virgins', as the day marked the feast day of St. Ursula and her virgin companions. In 1536 Jacques Cartier claimed the islands as a French possession on behalf of the King of France, Francis I. Though already frequented by Mi'kmaq people and by Basque and Breton fishermen, the islands were not permanently settled until the end of the 17th century: four permanent inhabitants were counted in 1670, and 22 in 1691.

In 1670, during Jean Talon's second tenure as Intendant of New France, a French officer annexed the islands after he discovered a dozen fishermen from France encamped there, naming them Saint Pierre and Miquelon. During King William's War and Queen Anne's War, English forces launched multiple attacks against French colonial settlements on the islands, and by the early 18th century the colonists had abandoned Saint Pierre and Miquelon altogether. In the 1713 Treaty of Utrecht which ended the War of the Spanish Succession, France ceded the islands to Britain.  The British renamed the island of Saint Pierre to Saint Peter, and small numbers of colonists from Great Britain and Britain's American colonies began to settle on the islands.

Under the terms of the 1763 Treaty of Paris, which put an end to the Seven Years' War, France ceded all its North American possessions to Britain, though the British granted fishing rights to French fishermen along the Newfoundland coast, and as part of that arrangement returned Saint Pierre and Miquelon to France's control. After France entered the American Revolutionary War on the side of the United States and declared war on Britain, a British force invaded Saint Pierre and Miquelon and briefly occupied them, destroying all colonial settlements on the islands and deporting 2,000 colonists back to France. In 1793, during the French Revolutionary Wars, another British force landed in Saint Pierre and, in the following year, again deporting the French colonial population, and tried to establish a community of Anglophone settlers. 

The nascent British colony was in turn attacked by the French Navy in 1796. The Treaty of Amiens of 1802 returned the islands to France, but Britain reoccupied them when hostilities recommenced the next year. The 1814 Treaty of Paris gave the islands back to France, though the UK occupied them yet again during the Hundred Days War in 1815. France then reclaimed the now uninhabited islands, in which all structures and buildings had been destroyed or fallen into disrepair. The islands were resettled in 1816. The settlers, mostly Basques, Bretons and Normans, were joined by various other peoples, particularly from the nearby island of Newfoundland. Only around the middle of the century did increased fishing bring a certain prosperity to the little colony.

20th century
In 1903 the colony toyed with the idea of joining the United States, but in the end nothing came of the idea. During the early 1910s the colony suffered severely as a result of unprofitable fisheries, and large numbers of its people emigrated to Nova Scotia and Quebec. The draft imposed on all male inhabitants of conscript age after the beginning of World War I in 1914 crippled the fisheries, as their catch could not be processed by the older men or the women and children. About 400 men from the colony served in the French military during World War I (1914–1918), 25% of whom died. The increase in the adoption of steam  trawlers in the fisheries also contributed to the reduction in employment opportunities.

Smuggling had always been an important economic activity in the islands, but it became especially prominent in the 1920s with the institution of Prohibition in the United States from January 1920. In 1931 the archipelago was reported by the New York Times to have imported  of whisky from Canada in 12 months, most of it to be smuggled into the United States. The end of Prohibition in 1933 plunged the islands once more into economic depression.

During World War II, despite opposition from Canada, Britain, and the United States, Charles de Gaulle's forces seized the archipelago from Vichy France, to which the local administrator had pledged its allegiance, in December 1941. In referendums on both islands, the population endorsed the takeover by Free France by over 98%. The colony became a French Overseas Territory in 1946. After the 1958 French constitutional referendum, the territory of Saint Pierre and Miquelon was asked to choose one of three options:  becoming fully integrated with France, becoming a self-governing state within the French Community, or preserving the status of an overseas territory; it decided to remain a territory.

Politics

Since March 2003, Saint Pierre and Miquelon has been an overseas collectivity with a special status. The archipelago became an overseas territory in 1946, then an overseas department on 19 July 1976, before acquiring the status of territorial collectivity on 11 June 1985. The archipelago has two communes: Saint-Pierre and Miquelon-Langlade. A third commune, Isle-aux-Marins, existed until 1945, when it was absorbed by the municipality of Saint-Pierre. The inhabitants possess French citizenship and suffrage. Saint Pierre and Miquelon sends a senator and a deputy to the National Assembly of France in Paris and enjoys a degree of autonomy concerning taxes, customs, and excise.

France appoints the Prefect of Saint Pierre and Miquelon, who represents the national government in the territory. The Prefect is in charge of national interests, law enforcement, public order, and, under the conditions set by the statute of 1985, administrative control. Since January 2021, the current prefect is Christian Pouget.

The local legislative body, the Territorial Council, has 19 members: four councillors from Miquelon-Langlade and 15 from Saint-Pierre. The President of the Territorial Council is the head of a delegation of "France in the name of Saint Pierre and Miquelon" for international events such as the annual meetings of NAFO and ICCAT.

France is responsible for the defence of the islands. The French Navy has maintained a patrol boat, the ex-trawler Fulmar, in the region since 1997. Law enforcement in Saint Pierre and Miquelon is the responsibility of a branch of the French Gendarmerie Nationale; there are two police stations in the archipelago.

On 10 January 2022 Saint Pierre and Miquelon made international news when MP Stéphane Claireaux, a member of the governing La République en Marche (LREM) was pelted with seaweed and stones in response to the government's new COVID-19 rules. The rule was announced by the state representative, the prefect, on 2 January for the island and angered residents.

Maritime boundary case

France claimed a  exclusive economic zone for Saint-Pierre and Miquelon, and in August 1983 the naval ship Lieutenant de vaisseau Le Hénaff and the seismic ship Lucien Beaufort were sent to explore for oil in the disputed zone. In addition to the potential oil reserves, cod fishing rights on the Grand Banks of Newfoundland were at stake in the dispute. In the late 1980s, indications of declining fish stocks began to raise serious concern over the depletion of the fishery.

The 1992 decision fixed the maritime boundaries between Canada and the islands, but did not demarcate the continental shelf.

Geography

Located off the western end of the Newfoundland's Burin Peninsula, the archipelago of Saint Pierre and Miquelon comprises eight islands, totalling , of which only two are inhabited. The islands are bare and rocky, with steep coasts, and only a thin layer of peat to soften the hard landscape. The islands, like Newfoundland, are geologically part of the northeastern end of the Appalachian Mountains.

A storm severed them in the 18th century, separating the two islands for several decades, before currents reconstructed the isthmus. , the tallest point in the territory at 240 meters high, is located on Grande Miquelon. The waters between Langlade and Saint-Pierre were called "the Mouth of Hell" until about 1900, as more than 600 shipwrecks have been recorded in that point since 1800. In the north of Miquelon Island is the village of Miquelon-Langlade (710 inhabitants), while Langlade Island is almost deserted (only one inhabitant in the 1999 census).

, whose area is smaller, is the most populous and the commercial and administrative center of the archipelago. Saint-Pierre Airport has been in operation since 1999 and is capable of accommodating long-haul flights from France.

A third, formerly inhabited island, known as  until 1931 and located a short distance from the port of Saint-Pierre, has been uninhabited since 1963.

Environment

Seabirds are the most common fauna. Seals and other wildlife can be found in the Grand Barachois Lagoon of Miquelon. Every spring, whales migrating to Greenland are visible off the coasts of Saint-Pierre and Miquelon. Trilobite fossils have been found on Langlade. The stone pillars off the island coasts called "L'anse aux Soldats" eroded away and disappeared in the 1970s. The rocky islands are barren, except for scrubby yews and junipers and thin volcanic soil. The forest cover of the hills, except in parts of Langlade, had been removed for fuel long ago.

Climate

In spite of being located at a similar latitude to the Bay of Biscay, the archipelago is characterized by a cold borderline humid continental/subarctic climate, under the influence of polar air masses and the cold Labrador Current. The mild winters for being a subarctic climate also means it has influences of subpolar oceanic climate, thus being at the confluence of three climatic types. The February mean is just below the  isotherm for that classification. Due to just three months being above 10 °C (50 °F) in mean temperatures and winter lows being so mild, Saint Pierre and Miquelon has a Köppen Climate Classification of Dfc, if bordering on Cfc due to the mildness of the winter and either Dfb or Cfb due to the closeness of the fourth-and fifth-warmest months to having mean temperatures at or above 10 °C (50 °F).

Typical maritime seasonal lag is also strong with September being warmer than June and March being colder than December. Precipitation is abundant ( per year) and regular (146 days per year), falling as snow and rain. Because of its location at the confluence of the cold waters of the Labrador Current and the warm waters of the Gulf Stream, the archipelago is also crossed a hundred days a year by fog banks, mainly in June and July.

Two other climatic elements are remarkable: the extremely variable winds and haze during the spring to early summer.

Economy

The inhabitants have traditionally earned their livelihood by fishing and by servicing the fishing fleets operating off the coast of Newfoundland. The climate and the small amount of available land militate against activities such as farming and livestock raising (weather conditions are severe, confining the growing season to a few weeks, and the soil contains significant peat and clay and is largely infertile). Since 1992 the economy has been in steep decline, following the depletion of fish stocks due to overfishing, the limitation of fishing areas and the ban imposed on all cod fishing by the Canadian Government.

The rise in unemployment has been countered by state financial aid for the retraining of businesses and individuals. The construction of the airport in 1999 helped sustain activity in the construction industry and public works. Fish farming, crab fishing and agriculture are being developed to diversify the local economy. The future of Saint Pierre and Miquelon rests on tourism, fisheries and aquaculture. Explorations are under way to exploit deposits of oil and gas. Tourism benefits from the proximity to similar tourist areas of Canada.  Distribution, public service, care, minor wholesale, retail and crafts are notable in the business sector.

The labour market is characterized by high seasonality, due to climatic hazards. Traditionally, the inhabitants suspended all outdoor activities (construction, agriculture, etc.) 
between December and April. In 1999 the unemployment rate was 12.8%, and a third of the employed worked in the public sector. The employment situation was worsened by the complete cessation of deep-sea fishing, the traditional occupation of the islanders, as the unemployment rate in 1990 was lower at 9.5%. The unemployment for 2010 shows a decrease from 2009, from 7.7% to 7.1%. Exports are very low (5.1% of GDP) while imports are significant (49.1% of GDP). About 70% of the islands' supplies are imported from Canada or from other parts of France via Nova Scotia.

The euro is the currency in Saint Pierre and Miquelon. The Canadian dollar is also widely accepted and used. The "Institut d'émission des départements d'outre-mer" (IEDOM), the French public institution responsible for issuing currency in the overseas territories that use the euro on behalf of the Bank of France, has had an agency in Saint Pierre since 1978. The islands have issued their own stamps from 1885 to the present, except for a period between 1 April 1978 and 3 February 1986 when French stamps not specific to Saint Pierre and Miquelon were used.

Demographics

The total population of the islands at the March 2016 census was 6,008, of which 5,412 lived in Saint-Pierre and 596 in Miquelon-Langlade. At the time of the 1999 census, 76% of the population was born on the archipelago, while 16.1% were born in metropolitan France, a sharp increase from the 10.2% in 1990. In the same census, less than 1% of the population reported being a foreign national.

The archipelago has a high emigration rate, especially among young adults, who often leave for their studies without returning afterwards. Even at the time of the great prosperity of the cod fishery, the population growth had always been constrained by the geographic remoteness, harsh climate and infertile soils.

Ethnography
Ruins show that Indigenous American people visited the archipelago on fishing and hunting expeditions before it was colonized by Europeans. The current population is the result of inflows of settlers from the French ports, mostly Normans, Basques, Bretons and Saintongeais, and also from the historic area of Acadia in Canada (Gaspé Peninsula, parts of New Brunswick, Prince Edward Island and Cape Breton) as well as Francophones who settled on the Port au Port Peninsula on Newfoundland.

Languages
The inhabitants speak French; their customs and traditions are similar to the ones found in metropolitan France. The French spoken on the archipelago is closer to Metropolitan French than to Canadian French and maintains a number of unique features. Basque, formerly spoken in private settings by people of Basque ancestry, had disappeared from the islands by the late 1950s.

Religion
The population is overwhelmingly Christian, with the majority being Roman Catholic. The Roman Catholic Vicariate Apostolic of Iles Saint-Pierre and Miquelon used to manage the local church until it was merged into the French diocese of La Rochelle and Saintes in 2018.

Culture
Every summer there is a Basque Festival, which has demonstrations of  harrijasotzaile (stone heaving), aizkolari (lumberjack skills), and Basque pelota. The local cuisine is mostly based on seafood such as lobster, snow crab, mussels, and especially cod.

Ice hockey is very popular in Saint-Pierre and Miquelon, with local teams often competing in Newfoundland-based leagues. The crew of the Fulmar, a patrol ship stationed in the islands, formed an ice hockey team, "O.K Fulmar". Several players from the islands have played on French and Canadian teams and even participated on France men's national ice hockey team in the Olympics.

Street names are not commonly used on the islands. Directions and locations are commonly given using nicknames and the names of nearby residents.

The only time the guillotine was used in North America was on Saint-Pierre in the late 19th century. Joseph Néel was convicted of killing Mr Coupard on Île aux Chiens on 30 December 1888, and subsequently executed by guillotine on 24 August 1889. The device had to be shipped from the French territory of Martinique and it did not arrive in working order. It was very difficult to get anyone to perform the execution; finally a recent immigrant was coaxed into doing the job. This event was the inspiration for the 2000 film The Widow of Saint-Pierre. The guillotine is now in a museum in Saint-Pierre.

Transportation

For many years there was no direct air link between Saint Pierre and mainland France. Although the 1999 opening of the Saint-Pierre Airport was intended to overcome this problem, a direct air link was not established until Air Saint-Pierre announced it would conduct direct seasonal flights from Paris in the summer of 2018. Until then, all flights from and to Saint-Pierre passed through Canada. Air Saint-Pierre's ATR 42 aircraft flies seasonally from the Canadian airports of Sydney and Stephenville, and year-round from Halifax, Montreal, and St John's. A smaller airport on Miquelon provides inter-island flights.

Ferry services operated by SPM Ferries connect Saint Pierre with Miquelon and the Newfoundland town of Fortune. In the summer, additional services operate between St Pierre and Langlade and between Miquelon and Fortune. Due to COVID-19 restrictions, services to Fortune were suspended between March 2020 and August 2021. The ferries are capable of carrying up to 188 passengers and 18 vehicles.

Communications
Saint-Pierre and Miquelon have four radio stations; all stations operate on the FM band, with the last stations converted from the AM band in 2004. Three of the stations are on Saint-Pierre, two of which are owned by Outre-Mer 1ère, along with one 1ère station on Miquelon. At night, these stations broadcast France-Inter. The other station (Radio Atlantique) is an affiliate of Radio France Internationale. The nation is linked to North America and Europe by satellite communications for telephone and television service.

The department of Saint-Pierre and Miquelon is served by three television stations: Saint-Pierre-et-Miquelon 1ère (call letters FQN) on Channel 8, with a repeater on Channel 31, and France Ô on Channel 6. While Saint-Pierre and Miquelon use the French SECAM-K1 standard for television broadcasts, the local telecommunications provider (SPM Telecom) carries many North American television stations and cable channels, converted from North America's NTSC standard. In addition, Saint-Pierre-et-Miquelon 1ère is carried on Shaw Direct satellite and most digital cable services in Canada, converted to NTSC.

SPM Telecom is also the department's main internet service provider, with its internet service being named Cheznoo (a play on Chez-Nous, French for "Our Place"). SPM Telecom also offers cellular phone and mobile phone service (for phones that adhere to the GSM standard). SPM Telecom uses the GSM 900 MHz band, which is different from the GSM 850 MHz and 1900 MHz bands used in the rest of North America.

The islands are a well-known separate country-level entity among many radio amateurs, identifiable with ITU prefix "FP". Those visiting, mainly from the US, activate Saint-Pierre and Miquelon every year on amateur frequencies. Amateurs collect (records of) contacts with these stations for Islands on the Air and DX Century Club awards; the Atlantic coast gives great takeoff for shortwaves. A few miles away is Signal Hill, St. John's which first communicated across the Atlantic, namely with Marconi's Poldhu Wireless Station in England.

News 
SPM Telecom publishes local news online at the Cheznoo web portal. Other publications include the magazine "Mathurin".

Education
The archipelago has four primary schools (Sainte Odile, Henriette Bonin, Feu Rouge, les Quatre-Temps), one middle school (Collège de Miquelon/Collège Saint-Christophe) with an annex in Miquelon, one state (government) high school (Lycée-collège d’Etat Emile Letournel) and one vocational high school.

The students who wish to further their studies after high school are granted access to scholarships to study overseas. Most students go to metropolitan France, although some go to Canada, mainly New Brunswick.

Saint Pierre's institute for higher learning is the Institut Frecker, which is associated with Memorial University of Newfoundland. Since 2000 Frecker had been operated by the Government of Saint Pierre and Miquelon, with support of the federal government of Canada and the provincial government of Newfoundland and Labrador.

Health
Saint-Pierre and Miquelon's health care system is entirely public and free. In 1994 France and Canada signed an agreement allowing the residents of the archipelago to be treated in St. John's. In 2015 St-Pierre and Miquelon indicated that they would start looking for a new healthcare provider as recent rate increases by Eastern Health in Newfoundland were too expensive (increasing to $3.3 million in 2014 from $2.5 million in 2010). Halifax, Nova Scotia and Moncton, New Brunswick were mooted as possible locations. Since 1985 Hôpital François Dunan provides basic care and emergency care for residents of both islands. The island's first hospital was military in 1904 and became a civilian facility in 1905. L'Hôpital-Hospice-Orphelinat opened in 1937.

Fire services
Fire stations:
 Both airports, St Pierre and Miquelon, separately 
 Service incendie Ville de St Pierre – Caserne Renaissance has five apparatuses: 2 pumpers, aerial ladders and a hazmat. This replaced Caserne Daguerre.
 Service incendie Miquelon has four apparatuses: aerial, hazmat, two pumpers

Most are second-hand units from North America but St Pierre acquired an aerial ladder from France in 2016.

See also
 Index of Saint Pierre and Miquelon–related articles
 Outline of Saint Pierre and Miquelon

Notes

References

Further reading

External links

 Government of Saint-Pierre-et-Miquelon 

 
1946 establishments in the French colonial empire
Archipelagoes of France
Dependent territories in North America
Former departments of France in France
French-speaking countries and territories
Island countries
Islands of the North Atlantic Ocean
Member states of the Organisation internationale de la Francophonie
New France
Overseas collectivities of France
States and territories established in 1946
Territorial disputes of Canada
Territorial disputes of France
Northern America